Anuradha Mehta is a former Indian actress and former model who appeared in Telugu,Odia and Kannada films.

Career
She made her debut with the Telugu movie Arya, by which she gained popularity and applause for her performance.

After the success of Arya, she appeared in 2005 Telugu romance film written, produced and directed by E. V. V. Satyanarayana.she starred along with Aryan Rajesh, Allari Naresh, Rama Prabha, and Suman.  In July 2005, with inclusion of Satyanarayana's sons Rajesh and Naresh, the film was reported as almost ready.

She made her Kannada debut with the 2006 Kannada language action film, Ajay.She paired opposite Puneeth Rajkumar The film was the remake of Telugu movie Okkadu.

The 2008 Kannada film Honganasuwith was the last film South of her career.Also She did Four Odia film Kotiye re Gotiye (2000),Tu Mo Kanhiya, Baazikar etc with Indian actor cum husband Sidhant Mohapatra.

Filmography

References

External links
 

Indian film actresses
Living people
Actresses in Kannada cinema
Actresses in Telugu cinema
Indian female models
21st-century Indian actresses
Year of birth missing (living people)
Place of birth missing (living people)